Dele Odule  (born 23 November 1961) is a Nigerian film actor and producer. He was nominated in the "Best Supporting Actor (Yoruba)" category at the 2014 Best of Nollywood Awards for his role in the film Kori Koto. He currently serves as the President of the Theatre Arts and Movie Practitioners Association of Nigeria.

Early life and education
Odule was born in the town of Ile-Ife, Osun State, but hails from Oru Ijebu, in Ijebu North local government of Ogun State in 1961, where he had his basic and secondary school education. He holds a Grade II Certificate from the Teacher's Training College, Oru before he proceeded to the University of Ibadan, Oyo State where he studied Theatre Arts.

Career
Dele started acting in a drama group called Oloko Theatre Group under the mentorship of Mukaila Adebisi. He made his debut appearance in 1986 before he was shot into the limelight after starring in the movie titled Ti Oluwa Ni Ile. He has since gone on to star in over 200 movies. He is also currently an ambassador for Airtel Nigeria.

Selected filmography

Ti Oluwa Ni Ile (1993)
Lakunle Alagbe (1997)
Oduduwa (2000)
Afonja (2002)
Olorire (2003)
Ògédé Didùn (2003)
Ogbologbo (2003)
Suku Suku Bam Bam (2004)
Omo Olè (2004)
Iwe Akosile (2005)
Idajo Mi Tide (2005)
Eru Ife (2005)
Ó kojá Ofin (2007)
Aye Ibironke (2007)
Bolode O'ku (2009)
Aworo (2012)
The Ghost and the Tout (2018)
Survival of Jelili (2019)
Kakanfo (2020)
The New Patriots (2020)
The Mystic River (2021)
King of Thieves (2022 film) (2022)

Awards and nominations

See also

 List of Nigerian film producers
List of Yoruba people

References

External links
 

Yoruba filmmakers
Living people
Male actors from Ogun State
Nigerian male film actors
Yoruba male actors
Male actors in Yoruba cinema
20th-century Nigerian male actors
21st-century Nigerian male actors
University of Ibadan alumni
1961 births
Yoruba-language film directors
Nigerian male television actors
Nigerian film award winners